115 Thyra is a fairly large and bright inner main-belt asteroid that was discovered by Canadian-American astronomer J. C. Watson on August 6, 1871 and was named for Thyra, the consort of King Gorm the Old of Denmark. Based upon its spectrum, it is categorized as a stony S-type asteroid.

Observations made between 1978 and 1981 produced a composite light curve with two minima and maxima. However, a subsequent study in 1983 only found a single minima and maxima. A synodical rotation period of 7.241 hours was determined. This was confirmed by observations between 1995 and 2000. The changes in brightness and color indicate a surface with an uneven composition.

The asteroid has a slightly elongated shape, with a ratio of 1.20 between the lengths of the major and minor axes. The orbital longitude and latitude of the asteroid pole in degrees is estimated to be  (λ0, β0) = (68°, 23°). Measurements of the thermal inertia of 115 Thyra give a value of around 75 m−2 K−1 s−1/2, compared to 50 for lunar regolith and 400 for coarse sand in an atmosphere.

References

External links 
 
 

000115
Discoveries by James Craig Watson
Named minor planets
000115
000115
18710806